The Scottish Railway Preservation Society is a charity, whose principal objective is the preservation and advancement of railway heritage in Scotland. The society's headquarters is at Bo'ness, in central Scotland.

Bo'ness and Kinneil Railway
The society operates the Bo'ness and Kinneil Railway, on which the historic collection is demonstrated in action, on Saturdays and Sundays from Easter until the end of October, and daily in July and August (intending visitors should check the website for details).

References

External links
Bo'ness & Kinneil Railway - official site
Scottish Railway Preservation Society - official site

Railway societies
Railway museums in Scotland
Engineering preservation societies
Transport organisations based in Scotland
1961 establishments in Scotland